Hirthia globosa is a species of tropical freshwater snails with an operculum, aquatic gastropod mollusks in the family Paludomidae.

This species is found in Burundi, the Democratic Republic of the Congo, Tanzania, and Zambia. Its natural habitat is freshwater lakes.

References

Paludomidae
Gastropods described in 1898
Taxa named by César Marie Félix Ancey
Taxonomy articles created by Polbot